Vehículos Automotores Mexicanos, S.A. (VAM) was a Mexican automaker from 1946 to 1986.

The original organization, a distributor and license manufacturer for Willys-Overland and AMC vehicles, became government controlled in 1963 with American Motors Corporation (AMC) holding a minority interest. The company imported and produced automobiles and light trucks under license from Willys, AMC, Eagle, Jeep, Chrysler, Renault and designed their own vehicles based on AMC platforms. The early-1980s collapse of the Mexican economy forced a sale of the Mexican government's interest in VAM to Renault, which shut down the firm in the late 1980s. The Mexican government maintains the rights to the VAM name and brand to this day.

History

Vehículos Automotores Mexicanos was established as its own company 1963 after the Mexican Government passed a law to control the privately owned Sociedad Mexicana de Credito Industrial (SOMEX), the parent company of Willys Mexicana S.A. (established since 1946 as a local manufacturer and distributor for Willys-Overland Jeeps and used both the names VAM and Willys Mexicana on its products) that held the license to produce and import AMC Ramblers. Willys Mexicana was transformed into VAM in 1963 after an agreement between American Motors Corporation (AMC) and the Mexican Government. After the restructuring of the original company, VAM proceeded to the construction of its own engine plant located in the municipality of Lerma, Estado de México. At the same time, AMC took a 40% equity interest in VAM, but did not actively participate in the company's management. Government content regulations required VAM vehicles had to have at least 60% locally sourced parts.

AMC's stake in VAM passed into the hands of Renault in late 1980 when Renault assumed the majority (controlling) ownership of AMC. The last AMC based cars were produced in 1983, the same year the last two wheel drive cars were produced by AMC in the US. Beginning in 1984 the company produced several Renault models as VAM vehicles.

Financial problems during a collapse of the Mexican economy (recession and devaluation of the Mexican peso, beginning in 1982) forced the eventual sale of the Mexican government's interest in the company to Renault. The Mexican government actually paid Renault some US$200 million to take over VAM and assume its debts in 1987. Renault then closed VAM down.

Products

From its initial inception as Willys Mexicana in the late 1940s the company manufactured Jeeps under license and AMC vehicles after 1954. Most VAM cars mimicked domestic (U.S.) models but had significant differences in aesthetic design. In the sixties, VAM produced the Rambler American (in 2- and 4-door and wagon versions plus a limited single-year hardtop imodel in two generations), a version of the AMC Rebel called the "Rambler Classic" (in 2-door hardtop and 4-door sedan versions) and the AMC Javelin. In the seventies VAM produced a full line of AMC Hornets, called first "Rambler American" and since 1975 just "American," plus a sport version called "Rambler American Rally" (subsequently "American Rally"). The Concord hatchback was badged an "American Rally AMX." Rambler Classics, AMC Gremlins, Javelins, and Pacers were sold under their original U.S. names. The AMC Matador sedan models were badged as the "Classic DPL" since 1972 and the Matador Coupe was produced in a sport version called "Classic AMX" and a luxury "Classic Brougham".

In later years, VAM badged variants of the AMC Spirit as the sporty "Rally AMX", luxury "Rally SST" and high performance "Rally GT". The Mexican version of the AMC Concord kept the "American" name, in base and GFS, ECD and DL models. Some VAM models mixed and matched body components from U.S. cars. Examples of Mexican-only cars include a 1977 two-door "Hornet" with a 1977-1978 Gremlin front clip. Many of these carried slightly different engines, all-original interiors, and different model and designation names than their counterparts in the United States and Canada, but were all based on U.S. bodies and used the same parts. Most bodies used the same year parts as U.S. production cars, but sometimes years and models were mixed. VAM built 1974-1976 Gremlins, for example, used the AMC Hornet grille and front fenders, and the 1977 Hornet mentioned above.

VAM produced one original body not available in the U.S. or other markets, the VAM Lerma (named after the town the engine factory was in). The Lerma was a "cut and weld" built body. The rear hatchback portion of an AMC Spirit (or rather VAM Rally) was cut from the Spirit body and then grafted onto the longer wheelbase AMC Concord (VAM American) in two and four door versions. This idea was presented to AMC, but the labor cost to produce the car using the cut and weld method would have been cost prohibitive in the U.S., and sales of the aging Concord/Spirit (in production since 1970) were not up to adding a new body that would require unique panels to be pressed.

All VAM engines were of AMC design, but built in Mexico. Moreover, VAM added unique engineering features to deal with low octane fuel and high altitudes. This included a  I6 engine (essentially a 258 block cast with a 0.16" larger bore) not available from AMC. The larger six helped counter high altitude/low octane fuel power loss and with the lack of a V8 engine option in VAM-produced vehicles.

In 1982, VAM's engineering department worked on a prototype Jeep Cherokee (XJ) and fitted VAM's straight six into it (in place of AMC's four-cylinder or optional V6 from General Motors). AMC was impressed by the project, which eventually developed into the 4.0-liter engine version introduced in the 1987 Jeep Cherokee (XJ).

References

External links
 VAM Jeeps in Mexico page

VAM 282 (4.62L)
Truck manufacturers of Mexico
Manufacturing companies based in Mexico City
American Motors
Car manufacturers of Mexico
Luxury motor vehicle manufacturers
Defunct manufacturing companies of Mexico